Teddy Allen may refer to:
 Teddy G. Allen (born 1936), United States Army general
 Teddy Allen (basketball) (born 1998), American basketball player